Aurél Farkas (born 31 March 1994) is a Hungarian football midfielder who plays for Szeged-Csanád.

Career statistics

References

External links
 
 

1994 births
Living people
Footballers from Budapest
Hungarian footballers
Association football midfielders
Szigetszentmiklósi TK footballers
ESMTK footballers
Ferencvárosi TC footballers
Szeged-Csanád Grosics Akadémia footballers
Szolnoki MÁV FC footballers
Csákvári TK players
Kaposvári Rákóczi FC players
Nyíregyháza Spartacus FC players
Nemzeti Bajnokság I players
Nemzeti Bajnokság II players
Hungary youth international footballers